Thomas Tate (born 19 December 1965 in Detroit, Michigan) is an American former boxer. In his professional career he twice fought for world titles at middleweight, losing to Julian Jackson and Roy Jones Jr. respectively. He later twice challenged Sven Ottke unsuccessfully for the super middleweight title. While training to fight Joe Calzaghe, Tate suffered a back injury and retired from the sport with a record of 41–7 (28 KOs).

External links 
 

1965 births
Living people
American male boxers
Boxers from Detroit
Middleweight boxers